Warner Jepson (March 24, 1930 – July 5, 2011) was an American composer from Bethlehem, Pennsylvania. In 1952, he graduated from Oberlin Conservatory of Music with a degree in composition. He spent most of his remaining years in the San Francisco Bay Area. He was a pioneer in the electronic music scene. Early works from the late 1950s include collaborations with dancers Anna Halprin, Simone Forti, and visual artist Robert Morris (artist).

Jepson composed a variety of works including film and ballet scores. His sculpture and photography was featured at the San Francisco Museum of Art. He received an Emmy in 1974 for a piece done in connection with KQED.

Film scores
 1972 Gold 
 1971 Luminous Procuress 
 1968 The Bed

References

1930 births
2011 deaths
American male composers
20th-century American composers
People from Bethlehem, Pennsylvania
Musicians from Pennsylvania
Oberlin Conservatory of Music alumni
20th-century American male musicians